Ulf Michael Widenius (often called Monty; born 3 March 1962, in Helsinki, Finland) is the main author of the original version of the open source MySQL database, a founding member of the MySQL AB company and CTO of the MariaDB Corporation AB. Additionally, he is a founder and general partner at venture capital firm OpenOcean.

Biography

Early years
Widenius went to the co-educational school Broban, which was first merged into Minervaskolan and later to Lönnbeckska gymnasiet.  After dropping out of Helsinki University of Technology, Widenius started working for Tapio Laakso Oy in 1981. In 1985 he founded TCX DataKonsult AB (a Swedish data warehousing company) with Allan Larsson. In 1995 he began writing the first version of the MySQL database with David Axmark, released in 1996. He is the co-author of the MySQL Reference Manual, published by O'Reilly in June 2002; and in 2003 he was awarded the Finnish Software Entrepreneur of the Year prize.

Until MySQL AB's sale to Sun Microsystems in 2008, he was the chief technical officer of MySQL AB. After the acquisition, he remained one of the primary forces behind the ongoing development of MySQL.

MySQL acquired by Sun
Widenius sold MySQL to Sun in January 2008, earning about €16.6 million in capital gains in 2008 (€16.8 million total income), making him one of the top 10 highest earners in Finland that year.

After Sun
In 2008, Widenius established venture capital firm OpenOcean with MySQL co-founder Patrik Backman and early advisors Tom Henriksson and Ralf Wahlsten.

On 5 February 2009, he announced that he was leaving Sun in order to create his own company.

On 12 December 2009, Widenius asked MySQL customers to lobby the European Commission (EC), regarding Oracle's acquisition of Sun, citing concerns about potential Oracle control of MySQL; this resulted in an online petition campaign called "Save MySQL".

After leaving Sun, he formed Monty Program AB and forked MySQL into MariaDB, named after his youngest daughter, Maria. It includes several patches and plugins developed by the company itself or the community. One of these plugins is the Aria storage engine, which was renamed from Maria to avoid confusion with MariaDB. Monty Program AB merged with SkySQL, who later renamed themselves MariaDB Corporation. He is also CTO of the MariaDB Foundation, the non-profit organisation charged with promoting, protecting and advancing the MariaDB codebase, community, and ecosystem.

The Open Database Alliance, also known as ODBA, was founded in 2009 by the Monty Program and Percona. According to its first announcement, "the Open Database Alliance will comprise a collection of companies working together to provide the software, support and services for MariaDB, an enterprise-grade, community-developed branch of MySQL".

Personal life
Widenius lives in Kauniainen, Finland with his second wife Anna and his youngest daughter, Maria. Widenius has three children – My, Max, and Maria – who inspired the names for MySQL, MaxDB and the MySQL-Max distribution, and MariaDB.

References

External links 
 

Swedish-speaking Finns
Free software programmers
1962 births
Living people
Businesspeople from Helsinki
Finnish computer programmers
Technology company founders
Aalto University alumni